The 2012–13 SV Darmstadt 98 season is the 116th season in the club's football history. In 2012–13 the club played in the 3. Liga, the third tier of German football. It is the club's second season in this league, having been promoted from the Regionalliga in 2011.

Squad

Review and events
The club lost coach Kosta Runjaic on 3 September to second division side MSV Duisburg. Runjaic was replaced with Jürgen Seeberger two days later.

At mid-season, Darmstadt were sitting in dead last, 20th place, in the relegation zone.

At the end of the season, the club finished in 18th, which is in the first spot of the relegation zone of the 3. Liga. But due to the fact that Kickers Offenbach had their license revoked, Darmstadt was not relegated.

Friendly matches

Competitions

3. Liga

League table

Results summary

Matches

References

External links
 2012–13 SV Darmstadt 98 season at Weltfussball.de 
 2012–13 SV Darmstadt 98 season at kicker.de 
 2012–13 SV Darmstadt 98 season at Fussballdaten.de 

Darmstadt
SV Darmstadt 98 seasons